Continuous mandatory ventilation (CMV) is a mode of mechanical ventilation in which breaths are delivered based on set variables. Still used in the operating room, in previous nomenclature CMV referred to "controlled mechanical ventilation" ("control mode ventilation"), a mode of ventilation characterized by a ventilator that makes no effort to sense patient breathing effort. In continuous mandatory ventilation, the ventilator can be triggered either by the patient or mechanically by the ventilator. The ventilator is set to deliver a breath according to parameters selected by the operator. "Controlled mechanical ventilation" is an outdated expansion for "CMV"; "continuous mandatory ventilation" is now accepted standard nomenclature of mechanical ventilation. CMV today can assist or control dynamically, depending on transient presence or absence of spontaneous breathing effort. Thus, today's CMV would have been called ACV (assist-control ventilation) in older nomenclature, and the original form of CMV is a thing of the past. But despite continual technological improvement over the past half century, CMV sometimes may still be uncomfortable for the patient.

Expected outcomes and considerations 
Continuous mandatory ventilation is associated with profound diaphragm muscle dysfunction and atrophy.  CMV is no longer the preferred mode of mechanical ventilation.

Volume-controlled CMV

Limit 
Limits in VC-CMV may be set and pressure based.  The ventilator will attempt to deliver the set tidal volume utilizing whatever pressure is required to reach its setting.  A pressure limit may be added to limit damage to the lungs (barotrauma).

Cycle 
Expiration cycling can be set by time or the pressure limit.  Once the Ti (inspiratory time) is reached, or a pressure limit is reached the ventilator will cycle into expiratory mode and allow passive exhalation until another breath is triggered.

Pressure-controlled CMV 
Pressure control (PC) is a pressure-controlled mode of ventilation.  The ventilator delivers a flow to maintain the preset pressure at a preset respiratory rate over a preset inspiratory time.

The pressure is constant during the inspiratory time and the flow is decelerating. If for any reason pressure decreases during inspiration, the flow from the ventilator will immediately increase to maintain the set inspiratory pressure.

Dual-control modes 

Dual-control modes are pressure controlled modes with an exhaled tidal volume target. They work on a breath-by-breath basis and provide pressure-limited time-cycled breaths, increasing or decreasing the pressure of the next breath as necessary to achieve a user-selected desired tidal volume. They are known by various vendor-specific terms such as pressure-regulated volume control (Siemens), autoflow (Dräger), adaptive-pressure ventilation (Hamilton Medical), volume-control plus (Covidien), among others.

Out-dated terminology 
Many terms have been developed to describe the same modes of mechanical ventilation.  Nomenclature of mechanical ventilation has become more standardized and these terms are no longer preferred but still may be seen in older research there are many different names that historically were used to reference CMV but now reference Assist Control. Names such as: volume control ventilation, and volume cycled ventilation in modern usage refer to the Assist Control mode.
 Assist/control
 A/C
 CMV
 Volume assist/control
 Volume control
 Volume limited ventilation
 Volume controlled ventilation
 Controlled ventilation
 Volume targeted ventilation

See also
Continuous spontaneous ventilation
List of modes of mechanical ventilation by category
Modes of mechanical ventilation
Pressure controlled continuous mandatory ventilation
Pressure controlled intermittent mandatory ventilation
Volume controlled intermittent mandatory ventilation

References

Respiratory therapy
Mechanical ventilation